Accrington  is a town in the Hyndburn borough of Lancashire, England. Commonly abbreviated by locals to "Accy", the town has a population of 35,456 according to the 2011 census.

Accrington is a former centre of the cotton and textile machinery industries. The town is famed for manufacturing the hardest and densest building bricks in the world, "The Accrington NORI" (iron), which were used in the construction of the Empire State Building and for the foundations of Blackpool Tower; famous for Accrington Stanley F.C. and the Haworth Art Gallery which holds Europe's largest collection of Tiffany glass.

History

Origin of the name
The name Accrington appears to be Anglo-Saxon in origin. The earliest citing appears in the Parish of Whalley records of 850; where it is written Akeringastun. In later records, the name variously appears as Akarinton in 1194; Akerunton, Akerinton and Akerynton in 1258; Acrinton in 1292; Ackryngton in 1311 and Acryngton in 1324.

The name may mean acorn farmstead from Anglo-Saxon æcern meaning acorn and tun meaning farmstead or village. The southern part of Accrington, the township of New Accrington, was formerly in the Forest of Blackburnshire and the presence of oak trees may be inferred from local place names like Broad Oak and Oak Hill. The products of oak trees were once an important food for swine and a farmstead may have been named for such produce. Anglo-Saxon  Æcerntun might become Middle English Akerenton, Akerinton and the like. Also worth considering is that in the Lancashire dialect  acorn was akran.

There is no known Old English personal name from which the first element can be derived. But if the Frisian names Akkrum, Akkeringa and Dutch name Akkerghem, are derived from the personal name Akker there may be a corresponding Old English name from which Accrington may be derived. Ingas being the Danish old Norse word for 'Tribe'.

Early history
There appears to be no mention of Accrington from the Roman period. The area typically appears to be heavily forested, with very few established settlements. According to folklore, a tall Danish tribal leader named Wada invaded the area between 760 and 798; who seems to have founded Waddington, Paddington (Padiham) and Akeringastun (Accrington). Descendants of the Wada held much of the lands until the sixteenth century. In 1442, the Waddingtons' hold leases on Berefeld (Bellfield), and in 1517 it is recorded that Thomas Waddington transferred the lands Scaytcliff (Scaitcliffe) and Peneworth (Pennyworth) to Nicholas Rishton and to his Son Geoffrey.
 
Accrington covers two townships which were established in 1507 following disafforestation; those of Old Accrington and New Accrington; which were merged in 1878 with the incorporation of the borough council. The William Yates map of The county Palatine of Lancaster printed in 1786 shows Old Accrington included the area of Oaklea and also the intersection of the Winburn River (now the River Hyndburn) and Warmden Brook. New Accrington included the area of Green Haworth and Broadfield. There have been settlements there since the medieval period, likely in the Grange Lane and Black Abbey area, and the King's Highway which passes above the town was at one time used by the kings and queens of England when they used the area for hunting when the Forest of Accrington was one of the four forests of the hundred of Blackburnshire.

Robert de Lacy gave the manor of Accrington to the monks of Kirkstall in the 12th century. The monks built a grange there; removing the inhabitants to make room for it. The locals got their revenge by setting fire to the new building, destroying its contents and in the process killing the three lay brothers who occupied it. An area of the town is named 'Black Abbey', a possible reference to the murders. Regardless of whatever happened, Accrington did not remain under monastic control for long before reverting to the de Lacys.

It is thought the monks of Kirkstall may have built a small chapel there during their tenure for the convenience of those in charge residing there and their tenants, but the records are uncertain. What is known is that there was a chapel in Accrington prior to 1553 where the vicar of Whalley was responsible for the maintenance of divine worship. However it did not have its own minister and it was served, when at all, by the curate of one of the adjacent chapels. In 1717 Accrington was served by the curate of Church, who preached there only once a month. St. James's Church was built in 1763, replacing the old chapel however it did not achieve parochial status until as late as 1870.

Industrial Revolution

Until around 1830, visitors considered Accrington to be just a "considerable village". The Industrial Revolution, however, resulted in large changes and Accrington's location on the confluence of a number of streams made it attractive to industry and a number of mills were built in the town in the mid-18th century. Further industrialisation then followed in the late-18th century and local landowners began building mansions in the area on the outskirts of the settlement where their mills were located while their employees lived in overcrowded unsanitary conditions in the centre.

Industrialisation resulted in rapid population growth during the 19th century, as people moved from over North West England to Accrington, with the population increasing from 3,266 in 1811 to 10,376 in 1851 to 43,211 in 1901 to its peak in 1911 at 45,029.

This fast population growth and slow response from the established church allowed non-conformism to flourish in the town. By the mid-19th century, there were Wesleyan, Primitive Methodist, United Free Methodist, Congregationalist, Baptist, Swedenborgian, Unitarian, Roman Catholic and Catholic Apostolic churches in the town. The Swedenborgian church was so grand that it was considered to be the ‘Cathedral' of that denomination.

For many decades the textiles industry, the engineering industry and coal mining were the central activities of the town. Cotton mills and dye works provided work for the inhabitants, but often in very difficult conditions. There was a regular conflict with employers over wages and working conditions. On 24 April 1826 over 1,000 men and women, many armed, gathered at Whinney Hill in Clayton-le-Moors to listen to a speaker from where they marched on Sykes's Mill at Higher Grange Lane, near the site of the modern police station and magistrates' courts, and smashed over 60 looms. These riots spread from Accrington through Oswaldtwistle, Blackburn, Darwen, Rossendale, Bury and Chorley. In the end, after three days of riots 1,139 looms were destroyed, 4 rioters and 2 bystanders shot dead by the authorities in Rossendale and 41 rioters sentenced to death (all of whose sentences were commuted).

In 1842 'plug riots' a general strike spread from town to town due to conditions in the town. In a population of 9,000 people as few as 100 were fully employed. From 15 August 1842 the situation boiled over and bands of men entered the mills which were running and stopped the machinery by knocking out the boiler plugs. This allowed the water and steam to escape shutting down the mill machinery.  Thousands of strikers walked over the hills from one town to another to persuade people to join the strike in civil disturbances that lasted about a week. The strike was associated with the Chartist movement but eventually proved unsuccessful in its aims.

In the early 1860s the Lancashire cotton famine badly affected Accrington, although less so than the wider area due to its more diverse economy, with as many as half of the town's mill employees out of work at one time.

Conditions were such that a Local Board of Health was constituted in 1853 and the town itself incorporated in 1878 allowing the enforcement of local laws to improve the town.

Accrington Pals

One well-known association the town has is with the 'Accrington Pals', the nickname given to the smallest home town battalion of volunteers formed to fight in the First World War. The Pals battalions were a peculiarity of the 1914-18 war: Lord Kitchener, the Secretary of State for War, believed that it would help recruitment if friends and work-mates from the same town were able to join up and fight together. Strictly speaking, the 'Accrington Pals' battalion is properly known as the '11th East Lancashire Regiment': the nickname is a little misleading, since of the four 250-strong companies that made up the original battalion only one was composed of men from Accrington. The rest volunteered from other east Lancashire towns such as Burnley, Blackburn and Chorley.

The Pals' first day of action, 1 July 1916, took place in Serre, near Montauban in the north of France. It was part of the 'Big Push' (later known as the Battle of the Somme) that was intended to force the German Army into a retreat from the Western Front, a line they had held since late 1914. The German defences in Serre were supposed to have been obliterated by sustained, heavy, British shelling during the preceding week; however, as the battalion advanced it met with fierce resistance. 235 men were killed and a further 350 wounded — more than half of the battalion — within half an hour. Similarly, desperate losses were suffered elsewhere on the front, in a disastrous day for the British Army (approximately 19,000 British soldiers were killed in a single day).

Later in the year, the East Lancashire Regiment was rebuilt with new volunteers — in all, 865 Accrington men were killed during World War I. All of these names are recorded on a war memorial, an imposing white stone cenotaph, which stands in Oak Hill Park in the south of the town. The cenotaph also lists the names of 173 local fatalities from World War II. The trenches from which the Accrington Pals advanced on 1 July 1916 are still visible in John Copse west of the village of Serre, and there is a memorial there made of Accrington brick.

After the war and until 1986, Accrington Corporation buses were painted in the regimental colours of red and blue with gold lining. The mudguards were painted black as a sign of mourning. The current Mayor of Accrington is Lance Sergeant Gary Archer of the Scots Guards.

Demography
The 2001 census gave the population of Accrington town as 35,200. The figure for the urban area was 71,220, increased from 70,442 in 1991. This total includes Accrington, Church, Clayton-le-Moors, Great Harwood and Oswaldtwistle. For comparison purposes that is approximately the same size as Aylesbury, Carlisle and Guildford urban areas.

The 2011 census gave a population of 35,456 for the Accrington built-up area subdivision (which includes Huncoat, Baxenden and Rising Bridge in Rossendale) and a population of 125,000 for the wider Accrington/Rossendale Built-up area.

The borough of Hyndburn as a whole has a population of 80,734. This includes Accrington Urban Area and other outlying towns and villages such as; Altham, Rishton, part of Belthorn, and Knuzden and Whitebirk (considered suburbs of Blackburn).

Economy
Formerly cotton and textile machinery were important industries in the town. NORIs, a type of iron-hard engineering brick, were produced nearby in Huncoat which was closed in 2013, but later reopened in 2015. Mills and factories are Accrington's past but there a few factories and garages which now occupy the old buildings.

Accrington power station was coal and refuse fired electricity generating station located in Argyle Street adjacent to the gasworks. It supplied electricity to Accrington, Haslingden and the Altham and Clayton-le-Moors areas between 1900 and 1958.

Regeneration and investment
The council has a regeneration plan in place, which will, according to the council, boost the local economy. The plan is to upgrade many old shops and to build a bus station. A memorial for the Accrington Pals may be built outside the town hall.

The Hyndburn Borough Council plans to spend £10 million to refurbish the town centre, which includes:

Revitalizing the town square to attract visitors.
Building a new bus station. Plans for the new bus station, which was later named 'George Slynn' in honour of the former Hyndburn Council leader, were put forward in January 2013 and approved in October 2014. The bus station was completed during and officially opened on 11 July 2016. The new station came under heavy criticism with traders of Accrington's Market and town hall, as it would see the old station discontinued, which was situated much closer and provided ease of access for regular customers.

Half of Blackburn Road is being refurbished and is now being made into a more attractive shopping street, upgrading shops, adding more trees, and repaving the pavements.

As of 2014, two new phases were being built: the first one called the Acorn Park, where new houses were being built with balconies and greener spaces, and Project Phoenix, which will also include new housing.

Geography
The River Hyndburn or Accrington Brook flows through the centre of the town. Hill settlements origins were as the economic foci of the district engaging in the spinning and weaving of woollen cloth. Wool, lead and coal were other local industries.

Geographical coordinates: 53° 46' 0" North, 2° 21' 0" West.

Transport
The town has strong local travel links as Accrington railway station lies on the East Lancashire Line serving trains running locally and trains running from Blackpool to York. However, recent changes to the train timetables have been a disservice to Accrington, increasing the journey time to Preston (a vital link to London or Scotland) by up to 1.5 hours. However, there are still buses to Manchester every thirty minutes as well as more frequent services to other towns in East Lancashire. The main road running through the town centre is the A680 running from Rochdale to Whalley. The town is served by junction seven of the M65 and is linked from the A680 and the A56 dual carriageway which briefly merge; linking to the M66 motorway heading towards Manchester.

There was once a rail link south to Manchester via Haslingden and Bury, but this was closed in the 1960s as part of cuts following the Beeching Report. The trackbed from Accrington to Baxenden is now a linear treelined cycleway/footpath. A train service to Manchester via the Todmorden Curve opened in 2015. A new bus station is being built in Accrington too.

Bus operator Pilkington Bus are based in Accrington, and Holmeswood Coaches, Rosso and Transdev Blazefield subsidiaries Blackburn Bus Company and Burnley Bus Company also provide bus services in the town; routes serve places such as Blackburn, Oswaldtwistle, Rishton, Burnley and Clitheroe. However M&M Coaches ceased business suddenly on 21 September 2016

Public services

Accrington Library, on St James Street, is a Carnegie library that opened in 1908. It is noted for its stained glass window designed by Gustav Hiller and as a place of inspiration for the young Jeanette Winterson.

Near the Tesco supermarket, there is Accrington Skate Park which is popular during the school holidays. On Broadway, Accrington Police Station serves the Borough of Hyndburn. In April 2003, Hyndburn Community Fire Station opened, also serving the Borough of Hyndburn.

Police Services
The town is served by the Lancashire Constabulary Police station on Broadway after moving into town from its previous location on Manchester Road as an effort to save money due to rising expenses and decreasing funding by the government. Crime is very low in Accrington compared to nearby towns.

Policing of the Railway station and railway-owned properties are served by the British Transport Police, nearest post in Preston.

Social

Governance
Accrington is represented in parliament as a part of the constituency of Hyndburn. The constituency boundaries do not align exactly with those of the district of the same name.

Accrington was first represented nationally after the Redistribution of Seats Act 1885 after the 1885 general election by Accrington (UK Parliament constituency). This seat was abolished in the 1983 general election and replaced with the present constituency of Hyndburn (UK Parliament constituency).

Accrington became incorporated as a municipal borough in 1878. Under the Local Government Act 1972, since 1974, the town has formed part of the larger Borough of Hyndburn including the former Urban Districts of Oswaldtwistle, Church, Clayton-le-Moors, Great Harwood and Rishton.

Hyndburn consists of 16 wards, electing a total of 35 councillors. Due to its size Accrington is represented by a number of wards in the Borough of Hyndburn. The town largely consists of the Milnshaw, Peel, Central, Barnfield and Spring Hill wards, although some parts of those wards are in other towns in the borough.

Health

The local hospital is Accrington Victoria Hospital however, as it only deals with minor issues, Accident and Emergency is provided by the Royal Blackburn Hospital. Other services are provided at the Accrington Pals Primary Health Care Centre and the Accrington Acorn Primary Health Care Centre.

Media
The chief publications in the area are the weekly Accrington Observer, part of MEN media, and the Lancashire Telegraph. Accrington Observer is currently stationed within the Market Hall.

Sport

Football team

Accrington Stanley F.C.,  entered the Football League in 1921 with the formation of the old Third Division (North); after haunting the lower reaches of English football for forty years, they eventually resigned from the League in 1962, due to financial problems, and folded in 1965. The club was reformed three years later and then worked its way through the non-league divisions to reach the Nationwide Conference in 2003. In the 2005–06 season, Stanley, after winning against Woking with three matches to spare, secured a place back in the Football League and the town celebrated with a small parade and honours placed on senior executives of the team. One of the teams relegated— and thus being replaced by Stanley—were Oxford United, who was voted into the Football League to replace the previous Accrington Stanley. The football stadium is called the Crown Ground. Until the 2012–13 season, when Fleetwood Town entered the league, Accrington was the smallest town in England and Wales with a Football League club.

Accrington Stanley Football Club has had its own pub in the town, the Crown, since July 2007.

Team history
An earlier club, Accrington F.C., was one of the twelve founder members of the Football League in 1888. However, their time in league football was even less successful and considerably briefer than that of Accrington Stanley: they dropped out of the league in 1893 and folded shortly afterwards due to financial problems. The town of Accrington thus has the unique "distinction" of having lost two separate clubs from league football. They are currently placed in EFL League One after winning the EFL League Two title in the 2017/18 season.

Cricket

Accrington Cricket Club plays at Thorneyholme Road in the Lancashire League. Cricket is also played in parks. Schools nearby have shown major interest in cricket and have held cricket training and tournaments.

Other sports
There are two sports centres, the main one being the Hyndburn Sports Centre, which recently renovated its swimming pool area and is situated near Lidl.

Education
Accrington has the following primary schools:

 St Mary's RC Primary School, Clayton le Moors
 Hyndburn Park Primary School,
 Peel Park Primary School,
 Sacred Heart Primary School,
 Benjamin Hargreaves CE Primary School,
 Springhill County Primary School,
 Accrington Huncoat Primary School,
 St Johns and St Augustines CE Primary School,
 St Mary Magdalen's CE Primary School,
 St Nicholas' CE Primary School,
 Woodnook Primary School,
 St James CE Primary School, Altham,
 St Johns CE Primary School, Baxenden,
 All Saints CE Primary School,
 Mount Pleasant Primary School,
 Green Haworth CE Primary School,
 Stonefold CE Primary School,
 St Peters CE Primary School.
 St Mary's RC Primary School, Oswaldtwistle. 
 St Anne's and St Joseph's RC Primary School
 St Oswald's RC Primary School 
 Hippings Methodist Primary School Oswaldtwistle 
 St Andrews CoE Primary School Oswaldtwistle 
 St Oswalds CoE Primary School Knuzden
 West End Primary School Oswaldtwistle 
 Moor End Community Primary School Oswaldtwistle 
 St Paul's CoE Primary School Oswaldtwistle 

The secondary schools serving Accrington are:
 Accrington Academy
 Heathland School
 The Hollins
 The Hyndburn Academy
 Mount Carmel Roman Catholic High School
 Rhyddings
 St Christopher's Church of England High School

The college in the town centre is Accrington and Rossendale College; nearby universities include University Centre at Blackburn College, and the University of Central Lancashire in Preston.

Landmarks

Haworth Art Gallery
The Haworth Art Gallery was previously a mansion named as Hollins Hill Mansion. The museum houses a collection of Tiffany glassware presented to the town by Joseph Briggs, an Accrington man who had joined Tiffany's in the late 19th century and eventually became art director and assistant manager. It is situated in Haworth Park on Manchester Road.

The Viaduct
The Viaduct is a bridge which has a railway line on it, it goes through the town and has many storage units and shop on sale by National Rail. The Viaduct ends at the Accrington Eco Station.

Town Hall
Accrington Town Hall was built in memory of Sir Robert Peel and opened as the Peel Institute in 1858; it is also listed.

The Arcade
The Arcade is a Victorian shopping Centre with about 10-15 outlets and has many restaurants there. It is on Church street near the town hall. The arcade has hardware shops and shops like Argos. There are some restaurants in there too. Sadly most outlets are closing since the year 2013. In 2016, there was a revamp of the Arcade which saw specialist shops such as Darts, Vinyl and Knitted Wear added into the Arcade.

Oakhill Park
Oakhill Park is a large and old park with a sceneric view of Accrington. It has won many awards such as the best park in Lancashire. It has also been awarded an Eco Award.  It is on Manchester Road.

Haworth Park
Haworth Park can be accessed from Manchester Road and is off Hollins Lane at the top of Harcourt Road.  The Park was originally William Haworth's private residence.  The Haworth Art Gallery has the Tiffany Glass collection

The Coppice and Peel Park
Peel Park is a park in Accrington which was opened by William Peel on 29 September 1909. The Coppice is a hill within the park, and provides a 2.2 mile scenic walk around the park. There was a centenary celebration marking 100 years from the Coppice being handed over to the people of Accrington on 26 September 2009. There was also a refurbishment of the paths and monument at the top of the Coppice at this time. Since then there has been several revamps to the Playground area of the park.

Notable residents

Alan Ramsbottom, professional cyclist
Andy Hargreaves, academic
Andy Kanavan, rock drummer with Dire Straits and Level 9 a.k.a. Andy Canavan was born in the town
Jenny (Jane) Kenney, sister of suffragette Annie Kenney who taught at Montessori school in the 1900s
Anthony Rushton, tech entrepreneur
Barry Stanton (actor), actor for RSC and films such as The Madness of King George
David Lloyd, cricketer, now a pundit for Sky Sports
Diana Vickers, singer-songwriter, stage actress and fashion designer
Edward Ormerod, mining engineer and inventor of the Ormerod safety link for use in coal mines
Frederick Higginbottom, journalist and newspaper editor
Graeme Fowler, cricketer, former England batsman, cricket coach and occasional pundit on BBC Radio's Test Match Special
Harrison Birtwistle, composer
Hollie Steel, Britain's Got Talent finalist of 2009
Jeanette Winterson, author; Oranges Are Not the Only Fruit is an account of her childhood in the town
John Rex Whinfield, chemist, inventor of Terylene (polyester), the first completely synthetic fibre invented in UK
John Virtue, artist
Jon Anderson, singer with rock band Yes, was born in the town
Jonathan Slinger, RADA trained actor
Julie Hesmondhalgh, actor, Hayley Cropper in the TV Soap Coronation Street
Mick O'Shea, author and scriptwriter
Mike Duxbury, footballer, was born in the town
Mystic Meg, astrologer, was born in the town as Margaret Anne Lake in 1942
Netherwood Hughes, World War I veteran, died in 2009, aged 108
Nicholas Freeston (1907-1978), Award-winning Lancashire poet
Pauline Aitken, artist
Paul Manning, undercover police officer and whistleblower
Reece Bibby, member of Stereo Kicks and 2014 finalist of The X Factor (UK TV series). Now a member of the band New Hope Club
Ron Hill, long-distance and marathon runner
Thomas Birtwistle, trade unionist
Vicky Entwistle, actor, Janice Battersby in the TV Soap Coronation Street
William Macrorie bishop of Maritzburg
Stephen Heys, footballer
Val Robinson, footballer and field hockey player

See also
 Listed buildings in Accrington
 Howard & Bullough

References

Further reading
William Turner. Pals: the 11th (Service) Battalion (Accrington), East Lancashire Regiment. Barnsley, South Yorkshire: Pen & Sword, 1998.

External links

 Hyndburn Borough Council

 
Towns in Lancashire
Unparished areas in Lancashire
Geography of Hyndburn
English royal forests